Canseco is a surname. Notable people with the surname include:

Ana Maria Canseco (born 1967), Mexican television personality
Augusto Benavides Canseco, Peruvian politician
Carlos Canseco (1921–2009), Mexican physician and philanthropist
George Canseco (1934–2004), Filipino songwriter
Javier Díez Canseco (born 1948), Peruvian politician
Jose Canseco (born 1964), Cuban-American baseball player and manager
Ozzie Canseco (born 1964), Cuban-American baseball player, twin brother of Jose
Pedro Diez Canseco (1815–1893), Peruvian soldier, politician, and interim President of Peru
Quico Canseco (born 1949), American politician